Liam Burke (2 February 1928 – 21 August 2005) was an Irish Fine Gael politician. He was a Teachta Dála (TD) for the Cork North-Central constituency. Burke was elected to Dáil Éireann at the 1969 general election for Cork City North-West. After the constituencies were redrawn, he stood at the 1977 general election in the new Cork City constituency, but lost his seat. He was elected to the 14th Seanad in 1977.

He was returned to the 21st Dáil at a by-election on 7 November 1979 in the same constituency, following the death of the Labour Party TD Patrick Kerrigan. That by-election win contributed to the decision of then Taoiseach Jack Lynch to resign in December 1979.

Burke lost his seat for the second time at the 1989 general election but regained it at the 1992 general election. He then retained his seat until retiring aged 74 at the 2002 general election. At that time he and Harry Blaney shared the distinction of being the oldest serving TDs.

He was educated at Christian Brothers College, Cork, and University College Cork. He was Lord Mayor of Cork from 1984 to 1985.

Burke died on 21 August 2005, aged 77.

His sister, Mary Woods, was elected as a councillor for Fine Gael on the Town Council for Midleton, County Cork from 1985 until town councils were abolished in 2014. His uncle Tadhg Manley was a Fine Gael TD from 1954 to 1961. He was a cousin of Fianna Fáil MEP Billy Kelleher.

References

 

1928 births
2005 deaths
Fine Gael TDs
Members of the 19th Dáil
Members of the 20th Dáil
Members of the 13th Seanad
Members of the 21st Dáil
Members of the 14th Seanad
Members of the 22nd Dáil
Members of the 23rd Dáil
Members of the 24th Dáil
Members of the 25th Dáil
Members of the 27th Dáil
Members of the 28th Dáil
Local councillors in Cork (city)
Lord Mayors of Cork
Nominated members of Seanad Éireann
Fine Gael senators